Evert Verbist (born 27 June 1984) is a Belgian road bicycle racer, who currently rides for the Melbotech amateur squad. He was born in Duffel.

For the 2014 season, Verbist will remain as an amateur, and will join the Bofrost-Prorace team.

References

External links
 
 

1984 births
Living people
Belgian male cyclists
Cyclists from Antwerp Province
People from Duffel